Molières may refer to:

 Molières, Dordogne
 Molières, Lot
 Molières, Tarn-et-Garonne
 Molières-Cavaillac, Gard
 Molières-Glandaz, Drôme
 Molières-sur-Cèze, Gard
 Les Molières, Essonne

See also 
 Molière (disambiguation)